Walter Schulz may refer to:
 Walter Schulz (philosopher)
 Walter Schulz (cellist)

See also
 Walter Schultz (disambiguation)